Joss is a given name and surname.

Notable people with the name include:

Given name or nickname 
 Joss Ackland (born 1928), British actor
 Joss Ambler (1900–1959), Australian-born British film and television actor
 Joss Christensen (born 1991), American freestyle skier and 2014 Olympic gold medalist
 Joss Fritz (c. 1470-c. 1525), insurgent in Germany
 Joss Labadie (born 1990), English footballer
 Joss McKinley (born 1981) English photographic artist
 Joss Naylor (born 1936), English fell runner
 Joss Whedon (born 1964), American screenwriter, film and television director and producer, television series creator, comic book author and composer
 George (Duala king) or Joss, a late 18th-century king of the Duala people of Cameroon

Stage name or pen name 
 Joss Stirling, a pen name of British novelist Julia Golding (born 1969)
 Joss Stone (born 1987), stage name of British female soul singer, songwriter and actress Joscelyn Eve Stoker
 Lewis Joss, one half of the magic double act Jay & Joss

Surname 
 Addie Joss (1880–1911), American Major League Baseball pitcher
 Chris Joss, French musician and record producer
 Jonathan Joss (born 1965), American actor
 Johnny Joss (1902–1955), American college football player
 Morag Joss (born 1955), English-born Scottish writer
 Robert L. Joss (born 1941), American businessman, banker, professor and former university administrator
 Scott Joss (born 1962), American country musician

Fictional characters
 Joss Carter, from the American television series Person of Interest
 Joss Merlyn, from the novel Jamaica Inn by Daphne du Maurier
 Joss Moody, from the novel Trumpet by Jackie Kay 
 Joss Peroni, from the Australian television series Blue Heelers
 Joss Possible, from the animated American television series Kim Possible